Precedence parser may refer to:

 Simple precedence parser
 Operator precedence parser